The 6.5mm Bergmann is an unusual centerfire cartridge produced for very early self-loading pocket pistols.

Design
The case is bottle-necked and steeply conical, and headspaces on the conical case walls.  Early versions were made without any rim or extraction groove; and relied upon blow-back for expulsion of the fired case from the chamber.  Later Bergmann pistols provided an extractor requiring a groove which produced a semi-rimmed case.

See also
Theodor Bergmann
Bergmann 1896

References

Pistol and rifle cartridges